The 1999–2000 Tunisian Coupe de la Ligue Professionnelle was the 1st edition of the top knockout tournament for the Tunisian league football clubs.

Group stage

Group A

Group B

Group C

Group D

Round of 16
Espérance Sportive de Tunis, Étoile Sportive du Sahel and Club Africain received a bye to Round of 16. Both Espérance Sportive de Tunis and Étoile Sportive du Sahel withdrew from the competition and were replaced by Jendouba Sport and CO Medenine.

Quarter-finals

Semi-finals

Final

See Also
1999–2000 Tunisian Ligue Professionnelle 1
1999–2000 Tunisian Ligue Professionnelle 2
1999–2000 Tunisian Cup

References
1999–2000 Tunisian Coupe de la Ligue Professionnelle on RSSSF.com

1999–2000 in Tunisian football